= Kråkerøy (borough) =

Administrative region in Fredrikstad, Norway

Coordinates: 59°10′N 10°55′E

The borough of Kråkerøy (Norwegian: Kråkerøy Herad) is an administrative region in Fredrikstad, Norway.
